Sessão de Terapia (English: Therapy Session) is a Brazilian television series written and directed by actor Selton Mello and based on the Israeli series BeTipul, created by Israeli psychologist Hagai Levi. It is also based on the American version of the series, In Treatment. It debuted on 1 October 2012 at GNT, at 10 pm and ended on 30 November, with a total of 45 episodes.

In June 2013, the series official Facebook page confirmed a second season, which began to be shot on the third day of that month. It debuted on 7 October and ended on 22 November, after 35 episodes.

After a third season with 35 episodes, Sessão de Terapia was discontinued in 2014. In 2019, it returned with a fourth, 35-episode season, which premiered all at once on Globoplay on 30 August 2019 and were expected to be aired in 2020 on GNT. Due to scheduling conflicts, Zecarlos Machado could not return as protagonist Dr. Theo Cecatto, so Mello himself stepped in and took the role of Caio Barone, the new psychologist.

The fifth season premiered on Globoplay on 4 June 2021 and ended on 9 July, with a total of 35 episodes.

Series overview

Plot

Season 1 (2012) 
The series follows Theo Cecatto (Zécarlos Machado), a middle-aged psychotherapist, and his relations with his patients, who visit him daily. Every week day, he welcomes a different patient: On Mondays, Júlia (Maria Fernanda Cândido), a woman dealing with the fear of relationships and who admits to be in love with him; on Tuesdays, Breno (Sérgio Guizé), an elite police sniper who is haunted by the death of a child resulting from a mistake he committed during an operation; on Wednesdays, Nina (Bianca Muller), a teenager gymnastic athlete who got involved in a traffic accident and needs Theo to evaluate her mental condition so she can receive insurance money; on Thursdays, Ana (Mariana Lima) and João (André Frateschi), a couple in constant conflict over personal problems and a pregnancy that one wished and the other didn't. On Fridays, Theo visits Dora Aguiar (Selma Egrei), a fellow psychologist, personal friend and supervisor who starts guiding him. Simultaneously, Theo deals with the fall of his own marriage with Clarice (Maria Luísa Mendonça).

Season 2 (2013) 
After the events in the first season, Theo is divorced and moved to an apartment, where he treats his patients now. The season's patients are: Carol (Bianca Comparato), a college student who recently discovered a cancer; Otávio (Cláudio Cavalcanti), a successful businessman who has been suffering from anxiety issues; Paula (Adriana Lessa), a lawyer who wishes to be a mother but feels she is getting too old for it; and Daniel (Derick Lecouflé), the ten-year-old son of Ana (Mariana Lima)  and João (André Frateschi) who struggles to deal with his parents' divorce. On Fridays, he still visits Dora. Simultaneously, he has to deal with the worsening of his father's condition at the hospital, the return of his childhood love and the constant threats of Antônio, Breno's father who blames Theo for his son's death.

Season 3 (2014) 
After a self-given period of vacation, Theo returns to his apartment where he treats new patients: Bianca Cadore (Letícia Sabatella) is a housewife who seems to be submissive to her husband's wills; Diego Duarte (Ravel Andrade), a rich teenage alcoholic who feels ignored by his father; Felipe Alcântara (Rafael Lozano), a young businessman working at his family's company and reluctant to come out to them, especially to his mother; and Milena Dantas (Paula Possani), Breno's widow who seems disturbed by her own routine of perfectionist tasks and obsessive-compulsive disorder. On Fridays, he takes part of a supervision group composed of him, Rita Costa (Camila Pitanga), Guilherme Damasceno (Celso Frateschi) and supervisor Evandro Mendes (Fernando Eiras).

Season 4 (2019) 
The patients now consult with Dr. Caio Barone (Selton Mello). On Mondays at 11 am, Caio receives Chiara (Fabíula Nascimento), an actress known for comic roles who refuses to accept a recent depression diagnostic. On Tuesdays at 4 pm, the patient is Guilhermina (Livia Silva), a teenager who focus too much on her social media accounts and avoid tackling her real problems. On Wednesdays at 9 am, he is consulted by Nando (David Junior), who has been experiencing erectile dysfunction of psychological origins. The last weekly patient (on Thursdays at 5 pm) is Haidée (Cecília Homem de Mello), an elderly woman who can't get over her husband's death. On Fridays at 5 pm, Caio is himself the patient, consulting with Dr. Sofia (Morena Baccarin), with whom he alternately flirts and fights.

Season 5 (2021)

Episodes

Season 1 (2012)

Season 2 (2013)

Season 3 (2014)

Season 4 (2019)

Season 5 (2021)

Cast

Season 1 (2012)

Guest stars

Season 2 (2013)

Guest stars

Season 3 (2014)

Guest stars

Season 4 (2019)

Guest stars

Season 5 (2021)

Guest stars

Awards and nominations

References

External links 
 Official website
 

2012 Brazilian television series debuts
Portuguese-language television shows
Brazilian drama television series
Brazilian workplace television series
Brazilian television series based on Israeli television series